South Korea, as Korea, competed at the 1976 Summer Olympics in Montreal, Quebec, Canada.

Medalists

Boxing
Men's Light Flyweight (–48 kg)
 Park Chan-hee
 First Round — Defeated Abderahim Najim (MAR), DSQ-3
 Second Round — Defeated Alican Az (TUR), 5:0
 Quarterfinals — Lost to Jorge Hernández (CUB), 2:3

Shooting

There were five South Korean shooters who qualified to compete in the following events:
Open

Volleyball

Men's team competition
 Preliminary round (group A)
 Lost to Poland (2-3)
 Defeated Canada (3-0)
 Lost to Cuba (0-3)
 Lost to Czechoslovakia (3-1)

 Classification Matches
 5th/8th place: Defeated Brazil (3-2)
 5th/6th place: Lost to Czechoslovakia (1-3) → Sixth place

 Team roster
 Kim Kun-bong 
 Jo Jae-hak 
 Lee Yong-kwan 
 Park Kee-won 
 Chong Moon-kyong 
 Lee Sun-koo 
 Lee Choun-pyo 
 Lee In 
 Kim Chung-han 
 Lee Jong-won 
 Kang Man-soo 
 Lim Ho-dam 
 Head coach: Lee Kyo-so

Women's Team Competition
 Preliminary round (group B)
 Lost to Soviet Union (1–3)
 Defeated East Germany (3–2)
 Defeated Cuba (3–2)

 Semi Finals
 Lost to Japan (0–3)

 Bronze Medal Match
 Defeated Hungary (3–1) →  Bronze Medal

 Team roster
 Lee Soon-bok
 Yu Jung-hye
 Byon Kyung-ja
 Lee Soon-ok
 Baik Myung-sun
 Chang Hee-sook
 Ma Kum-ja
 Yoon Young-nae
 Yu Kyung-hwa
 Park Mi-kum
 Jo Hea-jung
 Jung Soon-ok
 Head coach: Kim Han-soo

Wrestling

References
 Official Olympic Reports
 International Olympic Committee results database

Korea, South
1976
1976 in South Korean sport